Events in the year 1904 in Bulgaria.

Incumbents

Events 

 31 March – The Treaty of Sofia was signed between the Principality of Bulgaria and Kingdom of Serbia.

References 

 
1900s in Bulgaria
Years of the 20th century in Bulgaria
Bulgaria
Bulgaria